Natalia Fowler is a fictional character on ABC's daytime drama All My Children. She was portrayed by Shannon Kane from October 3, 2008 to February 4, 2011 on a regular basis (on contract from May 2009 to February 2011) and appeared on an occasional basis afterward, appearing on March 28, March 31, April 1, August 26, September 13, September 19, and September 23.

Character History
Natalia first crosses paths with Angie Hubbard in the hallway of an apartment building waiting for a friend. After a short conversation, Angie gets on the elevator. She then meets up with Angie's husband, Jesse and he tells her that she shouldn't be in Pine Valley. A few days later while trying to avoid Angie and Jesse, she bumps into their son, Frankie. Natalia is in desperate need of Jesse's help, but he continues telling her to get out of town because it isn't safe. When Jesse and Natalia finally meet up alone at the boathouse, it is revealed that she is his daughter. Natalia tells Jesse that her mother, Rebecca desperately needs him and Jesse ultimately calls to check on her. As a round of tornados strike the town, Natalia gets stranded at the Comeback Bar with the Hubbards and citizens of Pine Valley. The Comeback is destroyed and Natalia is one of those injured. Jesse tells Angie after they finally get her to the hospital, that Natalia may need surgery to see if her kidneys have been damaged. Angie says that because Natalia is unconscious, they'll need to contact her relatives for consent. Jesse insist that the surgery be done immediately because Natalia is his daughter. Rebecca finally comes to town to see about her daughter and formally introduces herself to the family. Angie and Rebecca take a liking to one another while Frankie struggles with his new sister. They eventually learn that Rebecca is dying from a brain tumor, and she then signs a DNR form. When Angie revives her after she collapses and puts her life support, the hospital is threatened with a lawsuit. Natalia doesn't want to, but reluctantly gives the OK to take Rebcca off life support. By some miracle, Rebecca starts breathing on her own. After a few days and when Rebecca gets back on her feet, she decides to go to San Francisco. The very next day on February 10, 2009, they learn that Rebecca has died. Randi Frankie's wife comforts her during and after her mother's illness. Angie also takes on the role of mother for Natalia.

Detective Natalia
Always admiring her father, Natalia decides to enroll in the police academy where she meets, Brot Monroe, Frankie's fellow soldier from Iraq. Natalia becomes jealous when Brot finishes the training before her but she becomes a detective shortly after. Natalia is very anxious to get into the action while Brot paces himself and is praised for it. On October 15, 2009 she accidentally shoots Aidan Devane and Jesse advises her to take some time off. After her suspension is lifted, she is sent on her first detective case where she goes under cover as a model for Fusion Cosmetics. Though she doesn't expect to get the job, Greenlee Smythe offers her the chance to one up Erica Kane and her model, Amanda Dillon. Natalia does a nude photo shoot secretly but is appalled when one of her fellow officers hangs her snaps shots all over the police station. Jesse and Brot go on the war path until they figure out who did it. Brot punches the guy which leads to him getting suspended. Brot and Natalia eventually become much closer though she insist they will only ever be friends. Natalia is later hired as the bodyguard for Amanda when someone begins stalking her. It is discovered that Amanda's crazed mother, Janet Dillon is actually stalking her and during the reveal, Natalia gets shot.

Family
In the summer of 2010, Angie is diagnosed with a disease that could cause her to go blind. She later finds out she is pregnant and the medication she is taking to save her eyesight could harm her child. Natalia, Frankie and Jesse have a hard time dealing when Angie decides to stop taking her medication. Meanwhile, Natalia notices that Frankie and Madison North are getting a little too close. Also Natalia is worried about Brot when he goes in for yet another surgery to fix his eyesight and she finally tells the truth, that she does care for Brot. On September 29, 2010, Natalia asks Brot out on date but he declines claiming he wanted to ask her out first. When he does, Natalia declines accusing him of being sexist.

Brot and Natalia began to date, and continued to date after Jesse warned them that dating a fellow officer was not allowed. They continued to spend time together, yet Natalia still remained distant. She told Brot she loved him but was afraid to get too close in case she lost him. Brot reassured her he loved her and would never do anything to hurt her. They became lovers. The mayor learned of their relationship and ordered Jesse to fire one of them. Brot asked to be fired, but Natalia took a detective job in Philadelphia. Brot remained on the Pine Valley police force, and they continued their relationship.

On August 26, 2011, Brot asked Natalia to marry him and she accepted.

On June 19, 2013, Natalia was one of the people who were threatened by Yuri Koslov.

References

All My Children characters
Fictional American police detectives
Television characters introduced in 2008
Female characters in television